Brittany or Britney Spears may refer to:

Britney Spears (born 1981), an American singer and actress
Brittany Spears (basketball) (born 1988), American basketball player

See also
Brittany S. Pierce, a character on Glee whose name is a reference to the singer